Aigerim Aitymova (born 14 February 1993) is a Kazakhstani footballer who plays as a midfielder for Women's Championship club FC Okzhetpes and the Kazakhstan women's national team.

Career
Aitymova has been capped for the Kazakhstan national team, appearing for the team during the 2019 FIFA Women's World Cup qualifying cycle.

References

External links
 
 
 

1993 births
Living people
Kazakhstani women's footballers
Kazakhstan women's international footballers
Women's association football midfielders